The Gouffre Berger  is a French cave discovered on 24 May 1953 by Joseph Berger, Bouvet, Ruiz de Arcaute and Marc Jouffrey. The Gouffre Berger is now ranked 37th deepest cave in the world, and the 4th in France.

To return from the bottom of the cave back to the surface can take between 15 and 30 hours, without long breaks.

They emerged after 13 days underground, having set a new world record at the time. This record was held until July 1982, when Patrick Penez attained . In 1990, a breakthrough was made, connecting the cave to the nearby "Scialet de la Fromagère". In June 2011 the terminal sumps were dived and in 2014 another attempt was made to pass the sumps.

In recent years there have been six fatalities in this cave, five due to water. During a storm or heavy rain, the Gouffre Berger can become a dangerous trap and the water levels rise very quickly. In 1996, Englishwoman Nicola Perrin (née Dollimore) and Hungarian Istvan Torda died due to violent flooding in the cave.

As of 2017 the system was estimated to contain approximately thirty-seven kilometres of passage with eleven entrances. 

Since 2013, clean-up actions have been carried out by cavers. At the end of 2018 the gouffre Berger has become clean again.

During the year 2022 a new network named "the Sardine Star", located at the level of the large waterfall of 27 meters, is being explored.

Location
The entrance is within the commune of Engins high on the Vercors Plateau. In June 2001, the commune lifted a two-year ban on exploration.

Cross section survey

Image gallery

See also
Vercors Massif
List of deepest caves

References

Bibliography
Opération -1000 by Jean Cadoux, Jean Lavigne, Géo Mathhieu, Louis Potié. - Grenoble : Edition de Grenoble, 1955.
Réédition : Opération -1000, idem. - Marseille : Édition Jeann Lafitte. 261 pages ; 
Gouffre Berger premier -1000. 1956-2016 by Serge Caillault. - Corenc, édition Spéléo Magazine 94. 36 pages ; 2016; 
Gouffre Berger, l'esprit d'équipe by Mark Wright, Robbie Shone and others.- Sheffield: published by Vertebrate Publishing, 2014. 254 pages ; 
 .
Envers et contre tout - Gouffre Berger 68 by Claude De Broyer, Philippe Delescaille, Alain Marbach, Georges Marbach and Lambert Martin-Bruxelles: published by Librairie Spéléo; mai 2020; 216 pages; .

External links
Access details, history and survey of cave
Gouffre Berger at Troglophil.de
 Caving in the Gouffre Berger – « Immersion » - In the footsteps of Fernand Petzl
Recommendations for descending the Gouffre Berger.

Landforms of Isère
Caves of Auvergne-Rhône-Alpes